The Dance of Death (German: Der Totentanz) is a 1919 German silent horror film directed by Otto Rippert and starring Werner Krauss, Sascha Gura and Karl Bernhard.

The film's sets were designed by the art director Hermann Warm.

Cast
 Werner Krauss as The Cripple 
 Sascha Gura as The Beautiful Dancer 
 Karl Bernhard as Frederic Hennekemper 
 Arnold Czempin as Dr. Sellin 
 Fred Goebel as Harry Free, der Flieger 
 Richard Kirsch
 Joseph Römer

References

Bibliography
 Hardt, Ursula. From Caligari to California: Erich Pommer's Life in the International Film Wars. Berghahn Books, 1996.
 McGilligan, Patrick. Fritz Lang: The Nature of the Beast. University of Minnesota Press, 2013.

External links

1919 films
1919 horror films
Films of the Weimar Republic
German silent feature films
Films directed by Otto Rippert
German horror films
German black-and-white films
Silent horror films
1910s German films